James Outman (born May 14, 1997) is an American professional baseball outfielder for the Los Angeles Dodgers of Major League Baseball (MLB). He made his MLB debut in 2022.

Early life
Outman grew up in Redwood City, California and attended Junípero Serra High School. In high school, he hit .305 with a .508 slugging percentage and .962 fielding percentage and also played linebacker and tight end for the football team.

College career
Outman attended California State University, Sacramento and played college baseball for the Sacramento State Hornets. He hit .249 in 147 games over three seasons with 23 homers and 99 RBI. He also played for the Humboldt Crabs in 2016 and the Bethesda Big Train of the Cal Ripken Collegiate Baseball League in 2017, where he was the Team MVP and League Offensive Player of the Year.

Professional career
The Los Angeles Dodgers selected Outman in the seventh round of the 2018 MLB Draft. He played with the Ogden Raptors in 2018 and the Great Lakes Loons in 2019. After missing the 2020 season as a result of the COVID-19 pandemic, Outman began 2021 with the Loons, where he hit .250 with nine home runs and 30 RBI. He was promoted to the Double-A Tulsa Drillers in July and was named Double-A Central hitter of the week two weeks later when he had seven extra base hits, including three home runs in six games against the Springfield Cardinals. He wound up hitting .289 with nine homers and 24 RBI in 39 games for Tulsa.

The Dodgers assigned him to the Glendale Desert Dogs of the Arizona Fall League after the season, where he was selected to the Fall Stars Game for the best prospects in the league. Outman was added to the Dodgers' 40-man roster in November 2021. He began the 2022 season with Tulsa before being promoted to the Triple-A Oklahoma City Dodgers at the end of June. Between the two levels in 2022, he appeared in 125 games, hitting .294 with 31 homers and 106 RBIs.

Outman was called up to the Major Leagues for the first time on July 30. He made his debut as the starting right fielder the following day against the Colorado Rockies and hit a home run in his first MLB at-bat off of Germán Márquez. He had three hits in his debut with the homer, a double and three RBI. Outman appeared in four games in the majors in 2022, with six hits in 13 at-bats, including two doubles, the one home run and 13 RBI.

References

External links
 
Sacramento State Hornets bio

1997 births
Living people
People from Redwood City, California
Baseball players from California
Major League Baseball outfielders
Los Angeles Dodgers players
Sacramento State Hornets baseball players
Bethesda Big Train players
Ogden Raptors players
Great Lakes Loons players
Tulsa Drillers players
Glendale Desert Dogs players
Oklahoma City Dodgers players